Edward Adams Spencer (November 5, 1881 – May 6, 1965) was a British athlete who competed mainly in the race walk. He competed for Great Britain in the 1908 Summer Olympics held in London in the 10 mile walk where he won the bronze medal.

He was born in Salford, Lancashire but later moved to London to work as a solicitor's clerk.

References

External links
 Edward Spencer. Sports Reference. Retrieved on 2015-01-25.

1881 births
1965 deaths
Sportspeople from Salford
British male racewalkers
English male racewalkers
Olympic bronze medallists for Great Britain
Athletes (track and field) at the 1908 Summer Olympics
Olympic athletes of Great Britain
Medalists at the 1908 Summer Olympics
Olympic bronze medalists in athletics (track and field)